Garra poecilura is a species of cyprinid fish in the genus Garra from southern Myanmar.

References 

Garra
Fish described in 2004